D36 is a state road in central Croatia connecting Kupa River area and the city of Sisak to Croatian motorway network at the A3 motorway Popovača interchange and to the D1 state road in Karlovac in immediate vicinity of the A1 motorway Karlovac interchange.

The road, as well as all other state roads in Croatia, is managed and maintained by Hrvatske ceste, state owned company.

Relocation of the route 

The D36 state road is planned to be rerouted so that it would connect Donja Zenčina interchange on the A1 motorway and the existing route serviced by the D36. The existing road is planned to be diverted between Gradec Pokupski and Lijevo Sredičko to the west, while the road to the east from that section would remain unchanged. This is a project of the Zagreb County and it is predicated on a predicted two-fold increase of traffic on Ž3106 after the construction of the Donja Zdenčina interchange, to between 3,000 and 7,000 vehicles per day.

Traffic volume 

Traffic is regularly counted and reported by Hrvatske ceste, operator of the road. Section of the road running through Sisak is not covered by the trafficcounting sites, but the section is assumed to carry a substantial volume of urban traffic in addition to the regular D36 traffic.

Road junctions and populated areas

Maps

References

D036
D036
D036
D036